Fontomfrom is a Bono type of hourglass-shaped drum mostly used by an ensemble of Bono people to communicate Bono monarchy royal messages in a Bono people ethnic group setting. The Fontomfrom ensemble provides music for ceremonies honoring Bono chiefs and Bono monarchy royal processions. The Fontomfrom is also used to recite proverbs or replicate patterns of speech at most Bono monarchy royal gatherings or a Bono monarchy royal durbar.

The Fontomfrom evolved from the popular hourglass-shaped drum (talking drum) of the 7th century. Shortly after the evolution, a few more non-hourglass shapes such as the Dunan, Sangban, Kenkeni and Ngoma drums were produced.

Prior to the Fontomfrom becoming the ensemble that it is today, it was first introduced into Bonoman by Bonohene Akumfi Ameyaw I and Bonohemaa Owusuaa Abrafi circa 1320s, from North Africa. As they love dancing and music, they introduced this drum to entertain themselves. Since its procurement, the single, large Fontomfrom drum has grown to become an ensemble of several drums.

References

External links
Video: Fontomfrom at Asafo Palace
Video: Fontomfrom | Hip Hop Generation Next Block Party '12 | Dancing in the Streets

African drums
Ashanti people
Ashanti musical instruments
West African musical instruments
Drums